Chief Emeka Anyaoku, GCVO, CFR, CON (born 18 January 1933) is a Nigerian diplomat of Igbo descent. He was the third Commonwealth Secretary-General. Born in Obosi, Anyaoku was educated at Merchants of Light School, Oba, and attended the University College of Ibadan, then a college of the University of London, from which he obtained an honours degree in Classics as a College Scholar. Aside from his international career, Chief Anyaoku continues to fulfill the duties of his office as Ichie Adazie of Obosi, a traditional Ndichie chieftainship.

Family background
Eleazar Chukwuemeka "Emeka" Anyaoku was born on 18 January 1933 to Emmanuel and Cecilia Anyaoku in Obosi, then a very large village in the eastern part of Nigeria.  Emmanuel Chukwuemeka Anyaoku had been educated to the middle school level after his primary education at the CMS school in Onitsha under the guardianship of Reverend William Blackett a Christian Missionary. After his education he worked first with the railways and later in the hospital in Kaduna in the Northern part of Nigeria before becoming a catechist.  After serving for a number of years, he went back to his village to farm.  He became Ononukpo (Head) of Okpuno Ire, a quarter in Ire, the largest village in Obosi.

Cecilia, née Adiba Ogbogu, was married as second wife by Emmanuel when he returned from Kaduna after following the death of his first wife.  Cecilia hailed from a family in Ugamuma quarter of Obosi.  She grew up at the home of Rev. Ekpunobi, her guardian, who was the first Obosi citizen to be ordained as an Anglican Priest.  He was regarded as one of the most enlightened and educated in the community then.  Cecilia stayed with the Ekpunobi family as a ward.  Rev. Ekpunobi, on learning of the death of Emmanuel's wife, invited him to his home and subsequently convinced Emmanuel and Adiba to marry each other. Their first child, a girl, did not survive.  Thereafter, Emeka was born and he has five siblings.

Education
Emeka Anyaoku at the age of seven was sent to live with his father's only brother, Egwuenu Anyaoku, at Umuahia to start schooling in a very rural school.  The highest class then at the school was standard four.  The colonial dispensation then generally did not encourage pupils to go beyond standard four or standard six.  At the age of 10, in 1943, Emeka was sent to stay with his father's cousin, Nathaniel Enwezor who was Headmaster at CMS Central School at Agbor, 75 km from Obosi.

For his secondary education, the young Anyaoku attended Merchants of Light School (MOLS)  at Oba.  It was a boarding school founded by a friend of his father's, Dr. Enoch Oli, a Nigerian educationist trained in London and Oxford.  Mr. Oli taught Emeka and the other students the importance of hard work, good character and good inter-personal relations.

During this period of his formative years, Anyaoku had begun to stand out as a smart, brilliant young man.  At Obosi village during holidays, especially Easter and Christmas times, when the students came home, one of his contemporaries, Chief Godfrey Eneli, recalled that they used to have debates and different kinds of students’ activities organized by the Obosi Students Association.  Anyaoku, Eneli said, showed particular signs of leadership qualities.  In his words, "I had the idea that he would become a leader, which he exhibited every time we all went home on holidays."  He said further, " we used to call him ‘lawyer’, because he was always arguing, and logical in whatever he approached.  We would be persuaded by his intellect and by his argument, and his approach to whatever discussions we had."

Another of his contemporaries, S.I. Metu, a classmate who later became a top banker and civil servant, extolled his interpersonal skills.  He said of Anyaoku, "one of his popularities was that he was a very good mixer, he virtually had no enemies because of his general friendliness….. from all we now know of Mr. Anyaoku, it is obvious that he was destined to be a diplomat, because he had all the makings – intelligence, friendliness, the ability to get things without offending anybody." Metu also recalled Anyaoku as a very studious student at the Merchants of Light School.  He stated, "Anyaoku cannot spare any moment for play – he was always reading or working on something.  Or occasionally, when he was tired and wanted to relax, he would crack some very serious jokes and everybody would be laughing." Anyaoku was among the second intake of 60 boys.  When they sat for the Cambridge School Certificate examination, he took 10 subjects and earned the school's first grade  pass, the highest level.

After his secondary education, Anyaoku in 1952 proceeded to teach at Emmanuel College, Owerri in the then Eastern Region, he was there until mid-1954 lecturing in mathematics, Latin and English.  He was reputedly an assiduous young teacher, meticulous in preparing his lesson notes.  He gave back to his students the best of what he had learned at MOLS while injecting humor into his teachings.

One of his teachers at MOLS had kindled in him an interest in the Classics.  His Latin teacher had inspired in him a love for the languages, laws and culture of the ancient Greeks and Romans, and the classical roots of the English language. Anyaoku then decided to go and study Classics at the new University College of Ibadan, the premier higher institution of its kind in the country, which had been instituted in 1948 as an overseas college of the University of London.

During the mid-1950s when Anyaoku was an undergraduate at the University College, Ibadan, the Nigerian nation was embroiled in debates, discussions and demonstrations on the political future of the country.  There were controversies on when Nigeria should gain independence from Britain and with what political structure it should seek independence whether as a unitary or federal state.  The city of Ibadan was one of the main epicenters of these debates.  And the University College, which had brought together brilliant students, lecturers and politicians from diverse parts of the country, became a centre of what was then described as national radicalism.

Anyaoku was in the thick of this as a student union leader.  He along with like-minds in the union leadership campaigned in favour of unitary state, against federalism.  They sent petitions and delegations to the three foremost political leaders in the country then, Dr. Nnamdi Azikiwe in the Eastern region of the country, Chief Obafemi Awolowo in the Western,  and Sardauna of Sokoto, Sir Ahmadu Bello in the Northern region.

Anyaoku in 1959 obtained a London University Honours Degree in classics as a college scholar and joined the Commonwealth Development Corporation (CDC) in Lagos. The corporation sent him as an Executive Trainee to the CDC headquarters in London from where he went on a course at the Royal Institute for Public Administration in London. On 1 October 1960, Nigeria was granted independence by Britain. And Anyaoku  was posted back to the CDC West Africa regional office in Lagos at the end of December 1960.

Marriage
In December 1961, Anyaoku then a CDC Executive Officer came in contact with a twenty year old Yoruba lady, Princess Ebunola Olubunmi Solanke, at a bachelor's eve party which he and his flatmate hosted for a friend of theirs in Lagos. The princess, familiarly known by the diminutive "Bunmi", was educated in England at a Christian girls boarding school, St. Mary's School at Hastings.  She thereafter attended Pitman College, London. Emeka and Bunmi were married at the Anglican Cathedral Church in Lagos on 10 November 1962.

Career
In 1959, Emeka Anyaoku joined the Commonwealth Development Corporation. In early 1962, Anyaoku came in contact with the then Prime Minister of Nigeria, Sir Abubakar Tafawa Belewa. He had accompanied his visiting boss, Lord Howick, Chairman of the Commonwealth Development Corporation, to a meeting with the Prime Minister on the activities of the corporation in Nigeria and the West African region.  The Prime Minister, impressed by Anyaoku's answers to some of his questions on the projects supported by the CDC in West Africa, took an interest in Anyaoku's future and persuaded him to consider joining the Nigerian Foreign Service. After a  grueling interview by the Federal Civil Service Commission, he was offered an appointment in the Foreign Service in April 1962.  Within a month of his entry, he was appointed Personal Assistant to the Permanent Secretary of the Ministry for External Affairs.  There he was closely involved in the process that led to the establishment of the Organisation for African Unity (OAU) in May 1963.  Following Nigeria's independence, he joined Nigeria's diplomatic service, and in 1963 was posted to its Permanent Mission to the United Nations in New York.

In 1966, he joined the Commonwealth Secretariat as Assistant Director of International Affairs. In 1968-69 there was a campaign by the Nigerian military government for the recall of Anyaoku; which said he was not a suitable Nigerian nominee, and they were anxious about his loyalty "to the country of his birth". But "Emeka had resigned from the Nigerian Foreign Service and Arnold had no difficulty in turning aside the demand".

In 1977, the Commonwealth Heads of Government elected him as Deputy Secretary-General.  In 1983, Nigeria's civilian government appointed Anyaoku to become Nigeria's Foreign Minister. After the overthrow of the government by the military later that year, he returned to his position as Deputy Secretary-General with the support of the new government in Nigeria and the endorsement of all Commonwealth governments.

At the Commonwealth Heads of Government Meeting at Kuala Lumpur on 24 October 1989, Anyaoku was elected the third Commonwealth Secretary-General.  He was re-elected at the 1993 CHOGM in Limassol for a second five-year term, beginning on 1 April 1995.

United Nations
In July 1963, at age 30, he was posted to Nigeria's Permanent Mission to the United Nations in New York.  His first child, Adiba, was born in the New York Lying-In Hospital on 20 November 1963, two days before President John F. Kennedy of the United States was assassinated.  A few weeks previously, Nigeria had become a Republic, with Nnamdi Azikiwe as the first President.  At his duty post at the United Nations,  Anyaoku as Nigeria's alternative representative in the United Nations special committee on Apartheid drafted the resolution – presented to the General Assembly by Nigeria in 1965 – that established a trust fund to enable governments to contribute to the defense of political detainees in South Africa.

He got embroiled in the crisis triggered by the Ian Smith administration in the then Southern Rhodesia in Southern Africa, who announced Rhodesia's Unilateral Declaration of Independence (UDI) from Britain.  Anyaoku spoke at various forums to condemn this development.  It was during one of these occasions that the news of Nigeria's first military coup d'état of 15 January 1966 reached him.  The  Prime Minister, Sir Abubakar Tafawa Balewa, the powerful Premier of the Northern Region, Sir Ahmadu Bello, and a number of other leaders of the post-independence state were assassinated during the coup d'état.  The coup d'état had taken place just one day after the Prime Minister hosted other Commonwealth leaders including the new Secretary-General, Arnold Smith, to a meeting in Lagos where they discussed the issue of Rhodesia.

Commonwealth years
In July 1965 the decision by Commonwealth Heads of Government to set up a Commonwealth Secretariat was implemented with the appointment of a very distinguished Canadian diplomat, Arnold Smith as the first Commonwealth Secretary-General.  The Secretary-General was in the process of assembling a multi-national, multi-cultural team at the core of the new Secretariat.

On his visit to Nigeria in November 1965, Smith had met and told the Prime Minister, Sir Tafawa Balewa in the presence of the then Nigerian's Foreign Minister and the Permanent Secretary, that he was looking for a young Nigerian foreign service officer who would "help him to make nonsense of racist myths."  After Smith left, the Prime Minister asked the Foreign Ministry to give him three names that would satisfy the Secretary-General's request.  Anyaoku was among the three names suggested and was selected by the Prime Minister for secondment to the new Commonwealth secretariat.
On arrival at the Secretariat in London in April 1966, Anyaoku was particularly impressed with the way the Secretary-General, Arnold Smith was handling the Rhodesia UDI issue.   He was made Assistant Director of International Affairs which later became the Political Affairs Division.  His first major assignment was to serve as Secretary of a Review Committee set up by the Secretary-General with the approval of Heads of Government to review all existing Commonwealth inter-governmental institutions with a view to determining which should be integrated into the newly established  Commonwealth Secretariat.

In July 1967 the Nigerian Civil War broke out.  During that period, he and his wife hosted many separate  luncheons and dinners in their London home for the Nigerian and Biafran representatives at the peace talks sponsored by the Secretary-General, Arnold Smith.  In the middle of the talks, he told the Secretary-General that he was willing to travel home to speak with the Biafran leader, Emeka Ojukwu about the Secretary-General's peace proposals to the two warring parties. He and Ojukwu had been friends since their boyhood.  Smith considered it a very risky venture but  however, allowed Anyaoku to go.
When he was embarking on the journey, his third child, Obi, who was just about three months old, was very ill in the hospital.  The doctors were worried that he might not survive the ailment.  When he told his wife, Bunmi, that he had to travel, she was shocked by his seeming insensitivity to their son's condition.  Anyaoku told her, "there are many more in worse state, dying every day, in Biafra."  She was speechless.

Anyaoku left on a Red Cross flight to Nigeria via Amsterdam and Sao Tome. The day after his arrival at the Biafran enclave, he had a scary experience of a bomb raid during which he had to dive with his two interlocutors in the Biafran Foreign Ministry under the table.  He eventually had a dramatic encounter with Ojukwu in his bunker at his headquarters. And when he left Biafra, after also seeing a number of his relations, he had a hair-raising exit on a flight that was evacuating children.  It was an aircraft with no seats, which took off from Uli to Gabon.

Anyaoku continued to be involved in various Commonwealth initiatives and negotiations, such as the Gibraltar referendum of 1967, the St Kitts-Nevis-Anguilla constitutional crisis of 1969 to 1970, the problems following Commonwealth Games’ boycotts during the 1980s and the process leading to peace and democracy in Zimbabwe, Namibia and in particular, South Africa.

He also moved up the ladder within the Commonwealth Secretariat. He became the Director of the International Affairs Division in 1971 and in 1975 rose to the position of Assistant Secretary-General.  In 1977, Commonwealth Governments elected him deputy secretary-general with responsibility for international affairs and the secretariat's administration.

In October, 1983, he resigned from his post and returned to Nigeria at the invitation of the Civilian President Shehu Shagari to serve as the country's foreign minister. On the overthrow of the government by the military on 31 December 1983, he went back with the unanimous support of the Commonwealth Governments to his previous position as Deputy Secretary-General. In 1989 at their meeting in Kuala-lumpur he was elected by Commonwealth Heads of Government the third Commonwealth Secretary-General. He was re-elected at the 1993 Limassol Commonwealth Heads of Government Meeting for a second five-year term.

Apart from striving to strengthen intra-Commonwealth relations and promoting democracy and good governance, one of the major projects he tackled during his tenure was the establishment of democracy in South Africa.  He tirelessly championed and spoke in favour of the struggle to rid South Africa of Apartheid.  In 1990, on the release of former President Nelson Mandela from Pollsmoor Prison, Anyaoku hosted Madiba to his first official dinner as Commonwealth Secretary-General in London. Between 1 November 1991 and 17 November 1993, he visited South Africa 11 times, using his diplomatic skills to help in breaking deadlocks in the negotiation process that brought the end of apartheid in South Africa.

In 1998, in recognition of Chief Emeka Anyaoku's contribution to the transition in South Africa, and the manner in which he had championed the cause of the progressive movements in Southern Africa, the President of South Africa accorded him the rare honour of addressing a joint sitting of the South African Parliament. President Nelson Mandela wrote the foreword of Chief Emeka Anyaoku's biography, Eye of Fire authored by Phyllis Johnson as well as to Chief Emeka Anyaoku's memoirs, The Inside Story of the Modern Commonwealth.

Anyaoku was involved in numerous interventions to broker peace between several Commonwealth leaders and opposition parties in their countries.  He also initiated the use of Commonwealth observer groups to assist elections in various countries.  Apart from exerting beneficial influence on the electoral process, the presence of Commonwealth observers made it easier for the parties who had lost to accept the result, if the election was judged by Commonwealth observers to be free and fair.  In his ten years as Secretary-General, he sent 51 election observer groups to various Commonwealth countries.

Beginning with President Kaunda in 1991, he intervened to help Zambia and several other Commonwealth nations to transit from one-party state or military regime to multi-party democracies. For example, he in the same year, persuaded President Arap Moi of Kenya to have a constitutional expert come and help the country revise its constitution to adapt it to the requirements of a multi-party democracy and thereafter in early 1992, persuaded the three opposition parties leaders who had rejected the result of the presidential elections to accept it thereby saving the country from a serious political crisis.

These interventions were not limited to Africa. His intervention in Bangladesh was another example that demanded a lot of time and patience. The country's two political leaders were Begum Zia and Sheikh Hasina. Begum Zia had become the prime minister following the assassination of her husband who was the Prime Minister. The leader of the opposition party, Sheikh Hasina, was the daughter of Sheik Abdul Rahman, the first Prime Minister of independent Bangladesh who with his entire family with the exception of daughter Hasina  had been killed in a military coup d'état.  Hasina was lucky to be out of the country on that fateful night.  Anyaoku persuaded the two leaders  to agree to his proposal to send an experienced representative to come to Bangladeshi to hold discussions with the Prime Minister, Begum Zia and the leader of the opposition Sheik Hasina with a view to finding a formula for mutual accommodation between their two parties.  Anyaoku consequently sent as his special representative, Sir Ninian Steven, a former Australian Governor-General, who spent weeks in Dhaka brokering peace between the government and the opposition parties.

He also intervened in Pakistan during a potentially destabilizing disagreement between the then President, Mr. Farooq Leghari and the Prime Minister, Nawaz Sharif.

The most challenging of his interventions was the crisis in his country Nigeria that followed the annulment of the June 12, 1993 presidential election by the then military junta of General Ibrahim Babangida. The election had apparently been won by Chief Moshood Abiola.  On the day after the annulment, Chief Anyaoku issued a strident statement, saying that the annulment was a "severe setback to the cause of democracy, particularly at a time when all Commonwealth governments have pledged themselves to promote democratic rule in their countries"; he called it "a bitter disappointment" to all those who had been looking forward to the assumption of office of a democratically elected government in Nigeria.

Anyaoku had a much tougher case when Babangida ‘stepped aside’ and General Sani Abacha after a few months of the contraption called Interim Government took over the administration of the country in a military coup d'état on 17 November 1993. Abacha instituted much more draconian measures. He arrested and jailed the presumed winner of the 12 June 1993 election, Abiola.  And the country was thrown into a great turmoil with labour strikes and public demonstrations raging all over.

Abacha exacerbated the crisis further by arresting, detaining and putting on trial Ken Saro-Wiwa and other Ogoni activists on a charge of complicity in the murder of four Ogoni Chiefs who had opposed their campaign methodology. Later in March 1995, the Abacha regime alleged that a coup attempt had been hatched against it.  Many observers dismissed this as a phantom coup. The regime, however, embarked on the arrest and detention of many serving and former officers, including erstwhile military Head of State, General Olusegun Obasanjo, and his previous deputy, General  Shehu Musa Yar’Adua.

The alleged coup plotters were tried by a military tribunal and were sentenced variously, with Obasanjo being given life imprisonment, while Yar’Adua was sentenced to death.  Anyaoku continued to campaign for a peaceful resolution of the crisis by sending messages to Abacha and making public statements, to no avail.  The matter came to a boiling point when Ken Saro-Wiwa and eight of his fellow accused were also sentenced to death. Anyaoku made a passionate appeal to Abacha soliciting for clemency for the condemned activists.  This appeal fell on Abacha's deaf ears and he eventually had Ken Saro-Wiwa and his colleagues executed on the eve of a meeting of the Commonwealth Heads of Government in Auckland, New Zealand in November 1995..  In reaction, Commonwealth leaders decided to suspend Nigeria from its membership of the association.

In the meantime, Anyaoku had sought to engage Abacha in discussions aimed at resolving the political crisis in Nigeria. Anyaoku had with Abacha's agreement met in July 1995 with Abiola in detention to discuss his proposal for a dialogue between the two parties with the aim of agreeing arrangements for the acceptance of the outcome of the annulled presidential elections. While Abiola on his part accepted the proposal, Abacha turned it down telling Anyaoku that he would prefer to seek a resolution of the crisis through a constitutional conference to be convened by him.

Following Abacha's sudden death on 8 June 1998, a new military regime under General Abdulsalami Abubakar came in to facilitate a quick return of the country to democratic dispensation. Anyaoku with his Commonwealth team gave full support to this process, including especially the national elections that produced the civilian administration of President Olusegun Obasanjo.

In pursuance of his declared priority from the beginning of his tenure to make the Commonwealth a potent force for the promotion of democracy and good governance, Anyaoku in early 1997, organized the first African Commonwealth Heads of Government Roundtable to discuss democracy and good governance on the continent. He retired from his position as Commonwealth Secretary-General on 31 March 2000.

On his retirement, the University of London established a professional chair at its Institute of Commonwealth studies named after him, the Emeka Anyaoku Professor of Commonwealth Studies.  He was also invited to be a Distinguished Visiting Fellow at the Centre for the Study of Global Governance, London School of Economics (2000-2002).  He was awarded the Freedom of the City of London in 1998 and has received decorations from Nigeria CFR and CON, and the highest national civilian honours of Cameroon, Lesotho, Madagascar, Namibia and Trinidad & Tobago's Trinity Cross (TC) as well as Honorary Knight Grand Cross of the Royal Victorian Order (GCVO) from her Majesty, The Queen in 2000. He was one of the fifty, and also one of the one hundred individuals who were awarded special gold medals for outstanding contribution to the country's development by the Federal Government in the celebrations of Nigeria's independence Golden Jubilee in 2010 and Centenary in 2014.

Emeka Anyaoku is a published author and now holds 33 honorary Doctorate degrees from top universities in Britain, Canada, Ghana, Republic of Ireland, Nigeria, South Africa, Switzerland and Zimbabwe.

Chief Emeka Anyaoku served under three democratically elected Presidents in Nigeria as Chairman of the Presidential Advisory Council on International Relations from 2000 to 2015.  He along with Kofi Annan played a seminal role in getting all the presidential candidates and their political parties to commit themselves to a violence-free electoral process by signing in January the Abuja Accord that ensured a relatively peaceful election and transition to a new democratic dispensation in Nigeria of President Muhammadu Buhari in May 2015.

The positions in which Chief Emeka Anyaoku served/is still serving include the following:

1.	1975 Leader, Commonwealth Mission to Mozambique
2.	1979-90  Member of the Council of Overseas Development Institute in London.
3.	1984-90  Member of Governing Council of the Save the Children Fund 
4.	1992-    Hon. Member of the Club of Rome
5.	1994-96  Member, World Commission on Forests
6.	2000-06  President, Royal Commonwealth Society
7.	2000- date    President, Royal African Society
8.	2001- date    Member, United Nations Eminent Persons Group to help advance the aims of the World Conference Against Racism
9.	2002-09  President, World Wide Fund for Nature, WWF
10.     2004-05  Chairman, United Nations Secretary-General's Panel on International support to African Development (NEPAD)
11.	2002-10  Member of the Governing Board of the South Centre in Geneva
12.	2005-13  Trustee of the British Museum
13.	2000-15  Chairman, Presidential Advisory Council on International Relations in Nigeria.
14.	2013- date    President, Metropolitan Club, Lagos.

Personal life
Installed in 1980 as the Ichie Adazie of Obosi, Chief Anyaoku has continued to fulfill the duties of the office of a traditional Ndichie chieftainship in Obosi. The Ichie Anyaoku has been married to Princess Bunmi Anyaoku since 1962. Princess Anyaoku is an Omoba of Abeokuta, Nigeria. Of their marriage, it was written in the Nigerian Sunday Times, then the widest circulating newspaper in the country, that 

They have four children, Adiba; their daughter– an attorney who serves on the board of Old Mutual plc –and three sons; Oluyemisi, Obiechina, and Emenike. Emeka has two grandchildren, born to Adiba and her husband; Irenne Ighodaro and Osita Ighodaro. In 1990, the heads of all the 19 communities of the Idemili Clan in his home State of Anambra accorded Anyaoku a unique honour by investing him with the title of Ugwumba Idemili.  His wife, Bunmi, is also a chieftain – Ugoma Obosi and Idemili – in her own right, with a long involvement in welfare work in Nigeria and in the Commonwealth.

Emeka Anyaoku is an Anglican, his father having converted to that faith. He writes that he is 

He is also a vice-president of the Royal Commonwealth Society.

References

Emmanuel College, Owerri alumni
1933 births
Alumni of the University of London
Commonwealth Deputy Secretaries-General
Commonwealth Secretaries-General
Foreign ministers of Nigeria
Honorary Knights Grand Cross of the Royal Victorian Order
Igbo politicians
Living people
Nigerian Anglicans
Nigerian diplomats
Permanent Representatives of Nigeria to the United Nations
Recipients of the Order of the Companions of O. R. Tambo
Trustees of the British Museum
University of Ibadan alumni
Alumni of University of London Worldwide
Igbo diplomats